Dolicrossea is a genus of small sea snails in the family Elachisinidae.

Species
 † Dolicrossea awamoana Finlay, 1930 
 † Dolicrossea clifdenensis Finlay, 1930 
 Dolicrossea labiata (Tenison Woods, 1876)
 Dolicrossea vesca Finlay, 1926

Species brought into synonymy
 † Dolicrossea atypica Laws, 1939: synonym of † Trochaclis atypica (Laws, 1939) (original combination)
 Dolicrossea bellula (A. Adams, 1865): synonym of Crosseola bellula (A. Adams, 1865)

References

Elachisinidae